Velká Bukovina is a municipality and village in Děčín District in the Ústí nad Labem Region of the Czech Republic. It has about 500 inhabitants.

Administrative parts
Villages of Karlovka and Malá Bukovina are administrative parts of Velká Bukovina.

References

Villages in Děčín District